Shivnath Singh (July 11, 1946 – June 6, 2003) was one of the few great long-distance runners that India has produced.  Singh represented India twice in the Asian games and twice at the Summer Olympics (1976 and 1980). He was born in Majharia, Buxar, Bihar in India. He joined the Indian Army in the Bihar Regiment and rose to the rank of Naib Subedar. He died on 6 June 2003 at Jamshedpur, India after a prolonged illness. He still holds India's national record for the marathon which he set in 1978. His is the longest standing athletics record in Indian history.

Career
He represented India at the 1976 Summer Olympics and placed 11th in the 1976 Olympic Men's Marathon. He dropped out of the 1980 Olympic Men's Marathon in Moscow.

Shivnath Singh competed barefoot throughout his running career. He holds the Indian national marathon record with a best time (2:12:00), a feat that he achieved in Jalandhar in 1978.

Achievements

References

External links
 
Olympic results for India including Shivnath Singh in the listings
Singh's obituary at Times of India
Singh's obituary at Rediff India Abroad
sports-reference
Singh's obituary at The Hindu Online Edition, 7 June 2003
Singh's obituary at Sunday Times of India, 8 June 2003

1946 births
2003 deaths
Athletes from Bihar
Indian male marathon runners
Indian male long-distance runners
Olympic athletes of India
Athletes (track and field) at the 1976 Summer Olympics
Athletes (track and field) at the 1980 Summer Olympics
Asian Games gold medalists for India
Asian Games silver medalists for India
Asian Games medalists in athletics (track and field)
Athletes (track and field) at the 1974 Asian Games
Commonwealth Games competitors for India
Athletes (track and field) at the 1978 Commonwealth Games
Recipients of the Arjuna Award
Medalists at the 1974 Asian Games